Peng Xuwei (彭旭玮, born 15 January 2003) is a Chinese swimmer. She competed in the women's 200 metre backstroke event at the 2018 Asian Games, winning the bronze medal.

References

External links
 

 
 

2003 births
Living people
Chinese female backstroke swimmers
Chinese female freestyle swimmers
Place of birth missing (living people)
Asian Games medalists in swimming
Asian Games bronze medalists for China
Swimmers at the 2018 Asian Games
Medalists at the 2018 Asian Games
Swimmers at the 2018 Summer Youth Olympics
Youth Olympic gold medalists for China
Swimmers at the 2020 Summer Olympics
Olympic swimmers of China
21st-century Chinese women